David Rees Williams (January 1900 – 30 December 1963) was a Welsh footballer. His regular position was as a forward. He was born in Abercanaid, Merthyr Tydfil. He played for Merthyr Town, Sheffield Wednesday, Manchester United, and Thames Association.

Williams also made eight appearances for Wales between 1921 and 1929, scoring twice.

References

External links
MUFCInfo.com profile

1900 births
1963 deaths
Welsh footballers
Merthyr Town F.C. players
Sheffield Wednesday F.C. players
Manchester United F.C. players
Wales international footballers
Association football forwards